Penyrheol is a residential area (and electoral ward) of the town of Caerphilly, Wales. It is part of the community of Penyrheol, Trecenydd and Energlyn in the County Borough of Caerphilly. It is often spelt as Pen-yr-heol by the local community. At the 2011 census the population of the community was 12,537.

Penyrheol has one school, named Cwm-Ifor.

Electoral ward
Penyrheol was an electoral ward to Mid Glamorgan County Council from 1989 to 1996, subsequently becoming a ward for Caerphilly County Borough Council.

References

External links
www.geograph.co.uk : photos of Penyrheol and surrounding area

Caerphilly
Mid Glamorgan electoral wards
Wards of Caerphilly County Borough